"Shuffla" is a song performed by Swedish music duo Samir & Viktor. The song made it to the final of Melodifestivalen 2018 in Friends Arena on 10 March.

Charts

Weekly charts

Year-end charts

References

2018 singles
English-language Swedish songs
Melodifestivalen songs of 2018
Swedish pop songs
Samir & Viktor songs
Song articles with missing songwriters